Eulamprotes atrella, the two-spotted neb, is a moth of the family Gelechiidae. It was described by Michael Denis and Ignaz Schiffermüller in 1775. It is found from most of Europe, east to Japan. The habitat consists of mixed deciduous woodlands.

The wingspan is 10.8–13 mm. The forewings are brilliantly brownish fuscous, with a yellow blotch on the costa at the apical one-third and also on the tornus. The hindwings are greyish fuscous. Adults are on wing from May to August in one generation per year.

The larvae feed on Hypericum species, including Hypericum maculatum. They feed internally in the stems and shoots. Pupation takes place in a case made from part of a leaf.

References

Moths described in 1775
Eulamprotes